The National Domestic Communications Assistance Center (NDCAC) is a National center, formed by the United States Federal Bureau of Investigation in 2012. The NDCAC's primary purpose is to develop technology to assist federal, state, and local law enforcement with technical knowledge regarding communication services, technologies, and electronic surveillance.

References

Federal Bureau of Investigation
2012 establishments in the United States